Platanthera flava, the palegreen orchid, is a species of pale-flowered orchid. It is native to eastern North America, from Texas east to Florida, north to Ontario, Quebec and Nova Scotia.

Platanthera flava  has from 10 to 40 flowers in an inflorescence. In the north of its range, in Canada, this species is particularly associated with shorelines of lakes and rivers, in the seasonally flooded zone. In Nova Scotia, it occurs in wet meadows on seasonally flooded shorelines with rare shoreline species such as Plymouth Gentian. In the south, such as in Texas, it is found in wet savannas and flatwoods. The shoreline habitats of the north are maintained by ice scour, while in the south, the flatwoods are maintained by recurring fire. Hence, it appears that this species depends upon recurring natural disturbance to maintain open sunny conditions.

Varieties
Two varieties are recognized:

Platanthera flava var. flava - southern part of species range
Platanthera flava var. herbiola (R. Brown) Luer - northern part of species range

References

External links 
 
 
 Maine Natural Areas Program fact sheet 

flava
Orchids of Canada
Orchids of the United States
Plants described in 1753
Taxa named by Carl Linnaeus
Flora without expected TNC conservation status